WCS may refer to:

Computing and technology
Warehouse control system, a software application 
Web Coverage Service, interface standard for digital geospatial information 
WebSphere Commerce Suite, a software platform framework for e-commerce
Windows Color System, a software color management technology in Windows Vista and onwards
Writeable Control Store, memory used to load the operating system of the Amiga 1000

Education
Wayne Community School District, or Wayne Community Schools, in Iowa, U.S.
Whitinsville Christian School, in Whitinsville, Massachusetts, U.S.
Wichita Collegiate School, in Wichita, Kansas, U.S.
Wilcox County School District (Georgia), U.S.
Williamson County Schools, in Tennessee, U.S.
Wycliffe Christian School, in Warrimoo, New South Wales, Australia

Other uses
Waste collection system, the space toilet on the Space Shuttle
Waste Control Specialists, a nuclear waste disposal company
West Coast Swing, a swing dance
Western Canadian Select, a heavy crude oil stream in North America
Wildlife Conservation Society, a US-based international wildlife organisation
Williams–Campbell syndrome, a disease of the airways
Wireless Communications Service, a US and Canadian set of frequency bands 
World Cosplay Summit, an annual international cosplay event
StarCraft II World Championship Series, esports competition for StarCraft II

See also

 WC (disambiguation)